Sausti is a village in Kiili Parish, Harju County, in northern Estonia, located about  south from the centre of Tallinn. It has a population of 153 (as of 2009).

Sausti manor
Sausti manor has a history that goes back to at least 1453, when it is mentioned for the first time in written records. During the course of history, the main building has been rebuilt continuously. The manor has belonged to various aristocratic, Baltic German families, including the Tiesenhausen family.

See also
List of palaces and manor houses in Estonia

References

External links
Sausti Manor
Sausti Manor at Estonian Manors Portal

Villages in Harju County
Kreis Harrien